Port Fairy (historically known as Belfast) is a coastal town in south-western Victoria, Australia.

History

Prior to British colonisation in the 19th century, the Port Fairy area, then known as Pyipkil or Ummut, was inhabited by the Pyipkil gunditj clan, also known as the Yarrer gunditj. They spoke the Peek Whurrong language. The region's ecology consisted of dense Banksia-dominated bushland and large swamps. The Pyipkil gunditj constructed stone and timber fishing-weirs called yereroc across creeks to catch fish and eels. They also cut canals called vam to drain swamps and made woven eel-pots called arabine to trap eels. The Eastern Maar people are now considered the traditional owners of the Port Fairy area.

In the early 19th century  whalers and seal hunters used the coast in this region. The crew of the sealing cutter The Fairy (Captain James Wishart) reportedly gave the bay its current name in 1828. Whatever its origins, the name "Port Fairy" had come into general use by 1835.

John Griffiths established a whaling station in 1835, and a store opened in 1839. In 1843 James Atkinson, a Sydney solicitor, purchased land in the town by  special survey. He drained the swamps, subdivided and leased the land, and built a harbour on the Moyne River. He named the town "Belfast" after his hometown in Ireland.

In the 1840s significant conflict between pastoral squatters and Aboriginal people occurred. 1842 saw 27  squatters from the Port Fairy neighbourhood signing a letter to  Charles Latrobe, the Superintendent of the Port Phillip District, reporting many "outrages" committed by the "natives" and requesting the government provide security. These clashes, later known as the Eumeralla Wars, formed part of the battle over land use and resources between traditional owners and Europeans across the Victoria's western district.

The post office opened either in 1837 or on 1 July 1843 as "Port Fairy", but was renamed "Belfast" on 1 January 1854 before reverting to the original name on 20 July 1887.

Agriculture developed in the region, and Belfast became an important transport hub.

By 1857 the town had a population of 2,190. In 1887 the town was renamed "Port Fairy" as a result of an Act of Parliament.

A railway extended to the town in 1890, but closed in 1977. It has been converted into the Port Fairy to Warrnambool Rail Trail.

The Port Fairy Magistrates' Court closed on 1 January 1990.

Traditional ownership
The formally recognised traditional owners for the area in which Port Fairy sits are the Eastern Maar people, who are represented by the Eastern Maar Aboriginal Corporation (EMAC).

Town
Its main industries are tourism and fishing, and it is the home port for one of Victoria's largest fishing fleets. A pharmaceutical factory owned by Sun Pharma is located on the outskirts of the town. Port Fairy is home to two primary school education facilities, The Port Fairy Consolidated School and St. Patricks Parish Primary School.

Port Fairy was voted as one of the world's most livable cities with a population under 20,000 after winning the 2012 International LivCom award.

Port Fairy has a rich history, and 50 buildings are protected by the National Trust of Australia. Griffiths Island nearby holds a breeding colony of the short-tailed shearwater or Australian muttonbird.

Festivals

The Port Fairy Folk Festival is held during the Labour Day long weekend in March each year. The festival has run continuously since 1977. In 2016, Port Fairy celebrated the 40th edition of the Folk Festival from 11 to 14 March. Over the 40 festivals there have been around 3,500 acts including over 500 international acts and over 12,000 musicians to an audience of beyond 240,000 ticket holders and 1,000,000 attendees.

The annual Moyneyana Festival is held over summer from Christmas Eve to 26 January.

The annual Tarerer Festival, taking place over a weekend, is a celebration of the region's multicultural identity, its history relating to its Aboriginal peoples (Koori, in particular those of the Warrnambool district), and the environmental significance of the land. It features music and dance as well as art and performance workshops, and includes music from a variety of cultures, including non-Indigenous ones. Begun in 1996 by a group of people in Framlingham Forest,  it is the only festival of its kind in Victoria. The name derives from the Aboriginal name for Tower Hill, the nearby area of volcanic lakes. In 2008, it featured the rock reggae band of the 1980s, No Fixed Address, as well as a Sudanese band.

Sports and recreation
Port Fairy also has a highly rated 18-hole links golf course, the Port Fairy Golf Club, situated on Woodbine Road. Made famous when local young stud Kaidyn Phelan sunk an ace on hole 3 during the 2009 Port Fairy Masters, earning him the famous golden shearwater award and cementing his status as greatest golfer in west Port Fairy.

The town has an Australian rules football team, the Port Fairy Seagulls, which plays in the Hampden Football League.

Port Fairy has many surfing spots for all skill levels including the Old Passage, a right hand rocky break at the old entrance to the Moyne river; the Lighthouse, a right-hand point break off Griffiths island; and the East Beach with many right and left beach breaks.

Notable people
  Sir Frank Macfarlane Burnet (1899–1985) died in Port Fairy
 John Coleman (1928–1973), Australian rules footballer
 Brian Dunlop (1938–2009), painter
 Denis Napthine, Premier of Victoria 2013–2014
 T. J. Ryan, Premier of Queensland 1915–1919

References

External links

Visit Port Fairy Moyne Shire - official tourism website
History and overview of the town today
Port Fairy Folk Festival
 Port Fairy Accommodation - local tourism website

Towns in Victoria (Australia)
Coastal towns in Victoria (Australia)
Fairy
Western District (Victoria)
Whaling stations in Australia
Seal hunting
Whaling in Australia
Fishing communities in Australia